Heliotropium pannifolium, the Saint Helena heliotrope, is now extinct but was formerly a hairy-leaved small shrub up to 1 m in height. it was only seen once, by the explorer W. Burchell in Broad Gut, Saint Helena (ca. 1808) and has never been seen again. Human impact on the island of Saint Helena was severe and the Saint Helena heliotrope is one of several extinct plants from that island (see List of extinct plants).

See also
 Flora of Saint Helena

References
 Cronk, Q.C.B. (1995) The endemic Flora of St Helena. Anthony Nelson Ltd, Oswestry.

External links
 UNEP-WCMC Species Database

pannifolium
Flora of Saint Helena
Extinct plants
Extinct biota of Africa
Plant extinctions since 1500
Plants described in 1884